Serangoon Garden Estate is a residential estate in the Serangoon district of the North-East Region of Singapore.

History
Serangoon Garden is one of the oldest estates on the island, and was built during the 1950s. 

The estate was upgraded in 2001 as part of the Singapore Government's plan to improve the older private housing estates in Singapore. Open roadside drains were covered up. Streetlights and road signs were replaced, and the estate's parks were also upgraded.

Serangoon Garden Circus was used as one of the locations for the country-wide millennium celebrations.

Electoral boundaries
Until 1988, Serangoon Gardens was a single seat constituency. When the Group Representative Constituency was introduced, Serangoon Gardens became part of the GRC. Since then, it has been part of the Aljunied GRC.

Housing
Serangoon Gardens is generally a private housing estate. There are a variety of types of housing, including terrace homes, semi-detached and bungalows. This area is popular with affluent Singaporeans, with its close proximity to amenities and generally prestigious schools.

Attractions
The food and beverage outlets are located in the estate's central area. Serangoon Garden Circus is at the centre of the estate. In this vicinity, there are cafés, restaurants, coffee shops, fast food restaurants and a shopping mall.

All the roads radiate from the circus, and the houses are located within walking distance. The estate has a tennis and squash centre at Burghley Drive. At Kensington Park Road, there is a country club known as Serangoon Gardens Country Club. Although the Country Club serves its in-house members, members of the public can also enjoy delicious food such as cantonese cuisine - Swatow Garden - which serves popular Hong Kong Dim Sum and dishes.

Amenities
Situated behind Maju Avenue is Paramount Building which was developed as Serangoon Garden Village in 2001. A new small shopping mall called MyVillage has opened in its place with NTUC FairPrice Finest and a branch of DBS Bank as its anchor tenants.

Transport

Public transport
The estate is served by public bus services. In addition, on weekday mornings from 7.30am to 9am, licensed private bus operators operate an express service plying between Serangoon Gardens and the city centre. The nearest MRT station is Serangoon MRT station on the North East and Circle lines at Upper Serangoon Road. Lorong Chuan MRT station is another nearby option, especially for residents living further away from the central Serangoon Gardens area.

Service 317 plies the Serangoon Garden Estate internally. The rest ply Serangoon Garden Circus.

Roads
There is 1 main road leading into the estate called Serangoon Garden Way.

See also
Lorong Chuan

References

Places in Singapore
Serangoon